Highway 112 (AR 112, Ark. 112, and Hwy. 112) is a north–south state highway in Northwest Arkansas. The route of  runs from Highway 16 Spur north through Fayetteville, across Interstate 49/US 62/US 71 (I-49/US 62/US 71) to Highway 12 in Bentonville.

Route description

The highway turns north and becomes Garland Avenue, which is a median-divided highway until Highway 112S/Wedington Drive/North Street. The medians were added in 2009 after contention from the City of Fayetteville and residents. Ultimately, it was decided to have one continuous median that becomes a turn lane, with separate bike lanes on both sides. 

AR 112 begins at Highway 16 Spur (Wedington Drive) in Fayetteville just north of the University of Arkansas campus. The route continues as an important artery through the city. The highway serves as the southern terminus of US 71B just south of an intersection with I-49/US 62/US 71. AR 112 continues north to Tontitown as Maestri Road, intersecting US 412 in Tontitown. Continuing north through Elm Springs as Elm St., the route enters Benton County.

AR 112 runs north in a brief concurrency with AR 264 in Cave Springs before entering Bentonville and terminating at AR 12 near the Bentonville Municipal Airport.

History

Arkansas Highway 112 was one of the original 1926 state highways. The original AR 112 was unpaved and ran  from Arkansas Highway 16 in Fayetteville north to an area south of Johnson. The route was paved in 1948, and extended north to Bentonville in 1951. The Cave Springs to AR 12 segment was paved at the time of addition, with the entire length becoming paved by 1956. Arkansas Highway 112S was created in 1971 from a segment of Arkansas Highway 16.

In the early 2000s, an agreement between the ARDOT, City of Fayetteville, and University of Arkansas to widen Highway 112 to four lanes between Highway 16 (Fifteenth Street) and I-49 came into place. Construction began in 2006 between North Street (Highway 112S) to Janice Street, and continued intermittently over the years as funding came available. As part of the agreement, ARDOT would build and pay for the widening projects, with Fayetteville accepting the road under city maintenance and control after the widening was complete. The University would maintain landscaping throughout the segment crossing the campus of the University of Arkansas.  

The route was truncated to its current northern terminus in February 2012, the route formerly continued along Highway 12 and US 71B to terminate at Highway 72 in Bentonville.

The route closely follows the same path it did during the Civil War and is designated as part of the Arkansas Civil War Trail. AR 112 is also designated as part of the Arkansas Trail of Tears northern route.

Major intersections

See also

References

External links

112
Transportation in Benton County, Arkansas
Transportation in Washington County, Arkansas